Castle Square is a historic square in front of the Royal Castle – the former official residence of Polish monarchs – located in Warsaw, Poland. It is a popular meeting place for tourists and locals. The Square, of somewhat triangular shape, features the landmark Sigismund's Column to the south-west, and is surrounded by historic townhouses. It marks the beginning of the bustling Royal Route extending to the south.

History

The column commemorating King Sigismund III of Poland (a work by Clemente Molli, erected in 1644) is the oldest and one of the symbolic landmarks of the city and the first secular monument in the form of a column in modern history. On the east side of the square stands the Royal Castle reconstructed after the devastation of World War II. It was formerly the residence of the dukes of Mazovia, and then of the Polish kings and grand dukes of Lithuania from the 16th to 18th centuries. The Germans bombed and blew it up in the beginning of World War II (September 1939), and then it was completely destroyed in 1944–1945 (see picture below).

In 1949 the square was connected by an escalator to the newly formed  (East-West Route), which runs under Castle Square though a tunnel; and the viaduct (leading to the Silesian-Dąbrowski Bridge) was built in the place of viaduct Pancer, destroyed during World War II. In 1907 the viaduct was modernized to handle electric trams that went over there less than a year later.

This square has witnessed many dramatic scenes in Polish history. Patriotic demonstrations took place there during the period before the outbreak of the January uprising of 1863. On 27 February 1861, Russian bullets killed five people. On 8 April 1861 five rota of infantry and two troops of Russian cavalry (about 1,300 people) led by General  carried out a bloody massacre of civilians, resulting in the deaths of more than 100 people.

During martial law the square became the scene of the particularly brutal riot, with ZOMO police rushing through demonstrations on 3 May 1982.

Events
The square is a hub for tourists and locals, who gather to watch street entertainers, participate in rallies, watch concerts and even engage in breakdancing.  In 1997, at the Castle Square, US President Bill Clinton gave a speech welcoming Poland to membership in NATO.

Castle Square featured the United Buddy Bears exhibition in summer 2008 – an array of 140 two-metre-high sculptures, each designed by a different artist, touring the world as a symbol of cultural understanding, tolerance and mutual trust. According to official information, more than 1.5 million visitors were counted.

See also
 Tourist attractions in Warsaw

Notes

External links

 Virtual tour through Royal Castle
 Castle Square, Zapiecek.com 

Squares in Warsaw
Landmarks in Poland
Śródmieście, Warsaw
Odonyms referring to a building